N25, N-25 or N.25 may refer to:

Roads
 Route nationale 25, in France
 N25 road (Ireland)
 N-25 National Highway, in Pakistan
 Nebraska Highway 25, in the United States

Other uses
 N25 (Long Island bus)
 Blue Heron Airport, in Schoharie County, New York, United States
 , a submarine of the Royal Navy
 London Buses route N25
 Nitrogen-25, an isotope of nitrogen